Stefanie Barz is a German physicist and Professor of Quantum Information and Technology at the University of Stuttgart. She studies quantum physics and quantum information in photonics.

Early life and education 
Barz studied mathematics, physics and computer sciences at the Johannes Gutenberg University Mainz. During her undergraduate studies she was an Erasmus Programme student at the KTH Royal Institute of Technology. She earned her PhD in Vienna before moving to the University of Oxford, where she worked in quantum photonics. She was awarded the University of Vienna LaudiMaxima Prize for her dissertation. Her research created the means to demonstrate blind computing using entangled photons. The photons were generated using a nonlinear crystal, and the entangled photons represent qubits of information. Whilst the sender knows the initial state of entanglement, companies in control of data processing will be unaware, making it impossible to decode the information without destroying it. Her work was covered in the New Scientist, as well as on the BBC and NBC. In 2013 Barz was awarded the Maria Schaumayer Prize and the Loschmidt Prize. During her PhD Barz took part in Falling Walls.

Research and career 
In 2014 Barz was awarded a Marie Skłodowska-Curie Fellowship to work on quantum optics at the University of Oxford. She worked with Ian Walmsley on three photon interference, which could be used for quantum cryptography. She secured her own funding to work on the project, Secure information processing in quantum networks (seQureNet). During the project she created integrated photon sources, fibre components and waveguide circuits.

She was appointed to the University of Stuttgart in 2017, where she is a Fellow and Board Member of the Center for Integrated Quantum Science and Technology. Barz works on encrypted cloud computing and photonics.  She uses light as a way to demonstrate the power of quantum information. This could make computers faster and more secure. In 2018 she was awarded a €3.6 million grant to work on quantum technologies involving silicon-based photonics.

She serves on the Strategic Advisory Board of QuantERA, a network of quantum technology researchers.

Awards and honours 
Her awards and honours include;

 2015 University of Oxford Millard and Lee Alexander Fellowship
 2015 European Commission Marie Skłodowska-Curie Individual Fellowship
 2014 University of Vienna & City of Vienna Doc.Award 2013
 2014 Austrian Chemical-Physical Society Loschmidt Prize
 2013 Maria Schaumayer Prize
 2012 Falling Walls Scholarship
 2011 University of Vienna Laudimaxima Award

References 

German women physicists
German women scientists
Academic staff of the University of Stuttgart
University of Vienna alumni
Quantum computing